The Siamese cat (แมวสยาม, Maeo Seeaam) is one of the first distinctly recognized breeds of Asian cat. Derived from the Wichianmat landrace, one of several varieties of cat native to Thailand (formerly known as Siam), the original Siamese became one of the most popular breeds in Europe and North America in the 19th century. The carefully refined, more extreme-featured, modern-style Siamese is characterized by blue almond-shaped eyes; a triangular head shape; large ears; an elongated, slender, and muscular body; and various forms of point colouration. Other than colouration, the modern-style Siamese bears little resemblance to the original stock, and the more moderate, traditional, or "old-style" Siamese, with a much rounder head and body, has been re-established by multiple registries as the Thai cat. The International Cat Association describes the modern Siamese as affectionate, social, intelligent, and playful into adulthood, often enjoying a game of fetch. Siamese tend to seek human interaction and also like companionship from other cats.

The Siamese (sometimes in the traditional form) is among the foundation stock of several other breeds developed by crossbreeding with other cats; some examples are the Oriental Shorthair and Colorpoint Shorthair, developed to expand the range of coat patterns; the long-haired variant most often dubbed the Himalayan; and hair-mutation breeds, including the Cornish Rex, Sphynx, Peterbald, and blue-point Siamese cat. The Siamese cat comes in two distinct variations: traditional, with a rounded head (though not as rounded as the later American Apple-head mix) and a slightly chubby body; or the modern Siamese, which is very skinny and has a wedge-shaped head. The long-haired Siamese is recognized internationally as a Balinese cat. Siamese cats are one of the more common breeds to have non-white irises.

History

Origins

Thailand
A description and depiction of the Wichienmaat (Siamese cat) first appears in a collection of ancient manuscripts called the Tamra Maew (The Cat-Book Poems), thought to originate from the Ayutthaya Kingdom (1351 to 1767 AD). Over a dozen are now kept in the National Library of Thailand, while others have resurfaced outside of Thailand and are now in the British Library and National Library of Australia. In addition to the old Siamese cat, the Tamra Maew also describes other heritage cats of Thailand including the Korat cat (Malet), which are still bred for preservation in Thailand today and has become popular in other countries, and Konja cat (Black cat), Suphalak (a controversy in Burmese cat).

When the capital city Ayutthaya was sacked on 7 April 1767 at the end of the Burmese–Siamese war, the Burmese army burned everything in sight. It returned to Burma, taking Siamese noblemen and royal family members with them as captives. Buddha images were hacked apart for their gold, and all the royal treasures were stolen. A Thai legend has it that the King of Burma Hsinbyushin found and read the poem for the Thai cats in the Tamra Maew. The poem describes Thai cats as being as rare as gold, and anyone that owns this cat will become wealthy. He told his army to round up all the Suphalak cats and bring them back to Burma along with the other treasures. Today in Thailand, this legend is told as a humorous explanation of the rarity of Thai cats.

Siamese
The pointed cat known in the West as "Siamese", recognized for its distinctive markings, is one of several breeds of cats from Siam described and illustrated in manuscripts called "Tamra Maew" (Cat Poems), estimated to have been written from the 14th to the 18th century. In 1878, U.S. President Rutherford B. Hayes received the first documented Siamese to reach the United States, a cat named "Siam" sent by the American Consul in Bangkok. In 1884, the British Consul-General in Bangkok, Edward Blencowe Gould (1847–1916), brought a breeding pair of the cats, Pho and Mia, back to Britain as a gift for his sister, Lilian Jane Gould (who, married in 1895 as Lilian Jane Veley, went on to co-found the Siamese Cat Club in 1901).  In 1885, Gould's UK cats Pho and Mia produced three Siamese kittens—Duen Ngai, Kalohom, and Khromata—who were shown with their parents that same year at London's Crystal Palace Show. Their unique appearance and distinct behaviour attracted attention, but all three of the kittens died soon after the show, their cause of death not documented.

By 1886, another pair (with kittens) was imported to the UK by Eva Forestier Walker (surnamed Vyvyan after 1887 marriage) and her sister, Ada. Compared to the British Shorthair and Persian cats that were familiar to most Britons, these Siamese imports were longer and less "cobby" in body types, had heads that were less rounded with wedge-shaped muzzles and had larger ears. These differences and the pointed coat pattern, which had not been seen before in cats by Westerners, produced a strong impression—one early viewer described them as "an unnatural nightmare of a cat." Over the next several years, fanciers imported a small number of cats, forming the base breeding pool for the entire breed in Britain. It is believed that most Siamese in Britain today are descended from about eleven of these original imports. In their early days in Britain, they were called the "Royal Cat of Siam", reflecting reports that they had previously been kept only by Siamese royalty. Later research has not shown evidence of any organised royal breeding programme in Siam. The original Siamese imports were medium-sized, rather long-bodied, muscular, graceful cats with moderately wedge-shaped heads and ears that were comparatively large but in proportion to the size of the head. The cats ranged from substantial to slender but were not extreme either.

Traditional Siamese versus modern development

In the 1950s–1960s, as the Siamese was increasing in popularity, many breeders and cat show judges began to favor the more slender look. As a result of generations of selective breeding, they created increasingly long, fine-boned, narrow-headed cats. Eventually, the modern show Siamese was bred to be extremely elongated, with a lean, tubular body, long, slender legs, a very long, very thin tail that tapers gradually into a point, and a long, wedge-shaped head topped by extremely large, wide-set ears.

By the mid-1980s, cats of the original style had largely disappeared from cat shows. Still, a few breeders, particularly in the UK, continued to breed and register them, resulting in today's two types of Siamese: the modern, "show-style", standardized Siamese, and the "Traditional Siamese", both descended from the same distant ancestors, but with few or no recent ancestors in common, and effectively forming distinct sub-breeds, with some pressure to separate them entirely.

In addition to the modern Siamese breed category, The International Cat Association (TICA) and the World Cat Federation (WCF) now accept Siamese cats of the less extreme type, and any wichianmat cat imported directly from Thailand, under the new breed name Thai. Other, mostly unofficial, names for the traditional variety are "Old-style Siamese" and "Classic Siamese", with an American variation nicknamed "Applehead" (originally a derogatory nickname due to its extremely rounded features compared to a true Siamese).

Appearance

The breed standard of the modern Siamese calls for an elongated, tubular, and muscular body and a triangular head, forming a perfect triangle from the tip of the nose to each tip of the ear. The eyes are almond-shaped and light blue, while the ears are large, wide-based, and positioned more toward the side of the head. The breed has a long neck, a slender tail, and fur that is short, glossy, fine, and adheres to the body with no undercoat. Its pointed colour scheme and blue eyes distinguish it from the closely related Oriental Shorthair. The modern Siamese shares the pointed colour pattern with the Thai, or traditional Siamese, but they differ in head and body type.

The pointed pattern is a form of partial albinism, resulting from a mutation in tyrosinase, an enzyme involved in melanin production. The mutated tyrosinase enzyme is heat-sensitive; it fails to work at normal body temperatures but becomes active in cooler (< 33 °C) areas of the skin. This results in dark colouration in the coolest parts of the cat's body, including the extremities and the face, which is cooled by the passage of air through the sinuses. All Siamese kittens, although pure cream or white at birth, develop visible points in the first few months of life in colder parts of their body. By the time a kitten is four weeks old, the points should be sufficiently clearly distinguishable to recognise which colour they are. Siamese cats tend to darken with age, and generally, adult Siamese living in warm climates have lighter coats than those in cool climates. Originally the vast majority of Siamese had seal (extremely dark brown, almost black) points, but occasionally Siamese were born with "blue" (a cool grey) points, genetically a dilution of seal point; chocolate (lighter brown) points, a genetic variation of seal point; or lilac (pale warm gray) points, genetically a diluted chocolate. These colours were considered "inferior" seal points and were not qualified for showing or breeding. These shades were eventually accepted by the breed associations and became more common through breeding programmes specifically aimed at producing these colours. Later, outcrosses with other breeds developed Siamese-mix cats with points in other cat colours and patterns, including red and cream points, lynx (tabby) points, and tortoise-shell ("tortie") points. 

In the United Kingdom, all pointed Siamese-style cats are considered part of the Siamese breed. In the United States, a major cat registry, the Cat Fanciers' Association, considers only the four original fur colours as Siamese: seal point, blue point, chocolate point, and lilac point. Oriental Shorthair cats with colour points in colours or patterns aside from these four are considered colour point Shorthairs in that registry.  The World Cat Federation has also adopted this classification, treating the colour point Short hair as a distinct breed.

Many Siamese cats from Thailand had a kink in their tails, but over the years, this trait has been considered a flaw. Breeders have largely eradicated it, but the kinked tail persists among street cats in Thailand.

Temperament

Siamese are usually very affectionate and intelligent cats, renowned for their social nature. Many enjoy being with people and are sometimes described as "extroverts". Often they bond strongly with a single person. They have a distinctive miaow that has been compared to the cries of a human baby and are persistent in demanding attention. These cats are typically active and playful, even as adults, and are often described as more dog-like in behavior than other cats. Some Siamese are extremely vocal, with a loud, low-pitched voice—known as a "Weezer" - from which they get one of their nicknames.

Siamese cats, due to their desire to be near people or other cats, occasionally suffer from depression or separation anxiety if left alone for long periods of time, and it is for this reason that Siamese cats are often bought in pairs so that they can keep each other company.

Health

Based on Swedish insurance data, which tracked cats only up to 12.5 years, Siamese and Siamese-derived breeds have a higher mortality rate than other breeds. The median lifespan of the Siamese group was somewhere between 10 and 12.5 years; 68% lived to 10 years or more and 42% to 12.5 years or more. Siamese Scooter holds the record as the world's oldest male cat, dying at the age of 30. The majority of deaths were caused by neoplasms, mainly mammary tumors. The Siamese also has a higher rate of morbidity. They are at higher risk of neoplastic and gastrointestinal problems, but have a lower risk of feline lower urinary tract disease. Vet clinic data from England shows a higher median lifespan of 14.2 years.

The most common variety of progressive retinal atrophy (PRA) in cats (among them the Abyssinian, the Somali, and the big group of Siamese-related breeds) is related to a mutation on the rdAc-gene, for which a DNA test is available.

The same albino allele that produces coloured points means that Siamese cats' blue eyes lack a tapetum lucidum, a structure which amplifies dim light in the eyes of other cats. The mutation in the tyrosinase also results in abnormal neurological connections between the eye and the brain. The optic chiasm has abnormal uncrossed wiring; many early Siamese were cross-eyed to compensate, but like the kinked tails, the crossed eyes have been seen as a fault, and due to selective breeding the trait is far less common today. Still, this lack of a tapetum lucidum even in uncross-eyed cats, causes reduced vision for the cat at night. This trait has led to their dependence on and interest in humans, which affects their hunting ability, a desirable trait for many owners. However, it makes them vulnerable to urban dangers such as night-time vehicular traffic. Unlike many other blue-eyed white cats, Siamese cats do not have reduced hearing ability.

Furthermore, the Siamese cat is more prone than other breeds to lung infections, especially in kittenhood, such as feline osteochondrodysplasia, vestibular disease and feline hyperesthesia syndrome.

Breeds derived from the Siamese

 Balinese – Natural mutation of the Siamese cat; a longhaired Siamese. In the largest US registry, the Cat Fanciers Association (CFA) is limited to the four traditional Siamese coat colours of seal point, blue point (a dilute of seal point), chocolate point, and lilac point (a dilute of the chocolate point). Other registries in the US and worldwide recognise a greater diversity of colours.
 Bengal cat – This interspecific hybrid cat breed was created by breeding an Asian leopard cat and a Siamese cat together.
 Birman – After almost all the individuals of the breed died out during the years of World War II, French breeders reconstructed the breed through interbreeding with various other breeds, including the Siamese. Modern Birman cats have inherited their pointed coat patterns from the Siamese.
 Burmese is a breed of domesticated cats descended from a specific cat, Wong Mau, who was found in Burma in 1930 by Joseph Cheesman Thompson. She was brought to San Francisco, where she was bred with Siamese.
 Havana Brown resulted from crossing a chocolate-point Siamese with a black cat.
 Colorpoint Shorthair – a Siamese-type cat registered in CFA with pointed coat colours aside from the traditional CFA Siamese coat colours; originally developed by crosses with other shorthair cats. Considered part of the Siamese breed in most cat associations but considered a separate breed in CFA and WCF. Variations can include lynx points and tortie points.
 Himalayan – Longhaired breed originally derived from crosses of Persians to Siamese and pointed domestic longhair cats to introduce the point markings and the colours chocolate and lilac. After these initial crosses were used to introduce the colours, further breed development was performed by crossing these cats only to the Persian breed. In Europe, they are referred to as colourpoint Persians. In CFA, they are a colour division of the Persian breed.
 Javanese – in CFA, a longhaired version of the Colorpoint Shorthair (i.e. a "Colorpoint Longhair"). In WCF, however, "Javanese" is an alias of the Oriental Longhair.
 Ocicat – a spotted cat originally produced by a cross between Siamese and Abyssinian.
 Oriental Shorthair – a Siamese-style cat in non-pointed coat patterns and colours, including solid, tabby, silver/smoke, and tortoise-shell.
 Oriental Longhair – a longhaired version of the Oriental Shorthair. 
 Savannah – The Savannah is a domestic hybrid cat breed. It is a hybridization between a serval and a domestic cat. (The first was bred with a Siamese)
 Snowshoe – a cream and white breed with blue eyes and some points that were produced through the cross-breeding of the Siamese and bi-coloured American Shorthair in the 1960s.
 Thai Cat – also called the Wichian Mat or Old Style Siamese, the original type of Siamese imported from Thailand in the 19th century and still bred in Thailand today; and throughout the first half of the 20th century, the only type of Siamese.
 Tonkinese – originally a cross between a Siamese cat and a Burmese. Tonkinese × Tonkinese matings can produce kittens with a Burmese sepia pattern, Siamese pointed pattern, or a Tonkinese mink pattern (which is something in between the first two, with less pattern contrast than the Siamese but greater than the Burmese); often with aqua eyes.
 Mekong Bobtail (Thai Bobtail)

In media

In literature and film
Siamese cats have been protagonists in literature and film for adults and children since the 1930s. Clare Turlay Newberry's Babette features a Siamese kitten escaping from a New York apartment in 1937. British publisher Michael Joseph recorded his relationship with his Siamese cat in Charles: The Story of a Friendship (1943). The "Siamese Cat Song" sequence ("We are Siamese if you please") in Disney's Lady and the Tramp (1955), featuring cats "Si" and "Am", both titled after the former name of Thailand, where the breed originated, became "notorious for its racist depiction of the Siamese cats". Si and Am are known in the film to wreak havoc against Lady, a fish inside a bowl in efforts to "make it drown" and furniture in the house. The 1958 film adaptation of Bell, Book and Candle features Kim Novak's own Siamese cat as "Pyewacket", a witch's familiar. The Incredible Journey (1961) by Sheila Burnford tells the story of three pets, including Siamese cat "Tao", as they travel  through the Canadian wilderness searching for their beloved masters. The book was a modest success when first published but became widely known after 1963 when it was loosely adapted into a film of the same name from Walt Disney. Disney also employed the same Siamese in the role of "DC" for its 1965 crime caper That Darn Cat!, with The New York Times commenting "The feline that plays the informant, as the F.B.I. puts it, is superb. [...] This elegant, blue-eyed creature is a paragon of suavity and grace".

Cultural References

 A Siamese cat has served as a mascot for the 1985 Southeast Asian Games and the 1995 Southeast Asian Games.

 In The Wizard of Oz, a Siamese Cat is the cause for Dorothy's missing the balloon ride back to Kansas. As the balloon is just about to lift off with the Wizard, Dorothy, and Toto on board, a girl in the crowd is holding a Siamese Cat, which distracts Toto, causing him to jump out of the basket, which, of course, causes Dorothy to jump out in pursuit.
 Bob Dylan mentioned a Siamese cat in his 1965 song "Like a Rolling Stone".
 The original Hang in there, Baby poster by Victor Baldwin featured a Siamese kitten named Sassy.
 The Rolling Stones song "Under My Thumb" includes the lyric "Under my thumb, a Siamese cat of a girl."
 Three Siamese cats are the main characters of the children's book Sagwa, the Chinese Siamese Cat by Amy Tan and the animated TV series of the same name.
 In the comic strip Get Fuzzy, one of the main protagonists is a Siamese cat named Bucky Katt.
 In The Cat Who... novel series by author Lilian Jackson Braun, a reporter and his Siamese cats, Koko and Yum Yum, solve mysteries together.
 In Krypto the Superdog, Catwoman's cat, Isis, is a villainous Siamese cat.
 In The Aristocats, Shun Gon is a Siamese with a Chinese accent and a member of Scat Cat's gang.
 A Siamese cat named Kenny appears in the Flying Witch anime. He is the familiar of Akane.
 In the Bad Kitty book series, there is a talkative Siamese cat named ''Chatty Kitty''. Nearly every time she meows, there is a star next to her meowing, which translates it.
 A Siamese cat is featured on the cover art for the Blink-182 album Cheshire Cat.
 In Garfield: The Movie, Nermal, a friend/rival of Garfield, is a Siamese cat.
 In the Skippyjon Jones book series, the titular character is a Siamese cat who befriends a group of Chihuahuas.
The first Blue Peter pet cat, Jason, was a Seal-point Siamese Cat.
My Favorite Murder podcast host Georgia Hardstark owns a cross-eyed Siamese Cat named Elvis. In each episode, after saying their catchphrase "Stay Sexy and Don't Get Murdered", Hardstark asks:"Elvis, want a cookie?" and the episode ends with Elvis meowing into the microphone. He has garnered much attention from the fandom due to his prominent meow and crossed eyes, and often acts as a mascot for the show. He died in December 2020.
 The Tom and Jerry direct-to-video films feature a trio of antagonistic Siamese cats named Tin, Pan, and Alley.

See also
 Thai cat, a.k.a. Old-style Siamese or Traditional Siamese

References

External links 

 Siamese Yearbook Articles Old articles on the Siamese
 Siamese and Oriental Database pedigree data base with each cat's health information
 Siamese and Oriental PRA health program 

Cat breeds originating in Thailand
Cat breeds
Linebred animals